The 2010 The Citadel Bulldogs football team represented The Citadel, The Military College of South Carolina in the 2010 NCAA Division I FCS football season. The Bulldogs were led by sixth year head coach Kevin Higgins and played their home games at Johnson Hagood Stadium. They played as members of the Southern Conference, as they have since 1936.

Schedule

NFL Draft selections

References

Citadel
The Citadel Bulldogs football seasons
Citadel football